Kishor Satya is an Indian actor who works in Malayalam films and television soaps.

Career
Satya started his career in the visual media as the assistant director of Malayalam movies. He made his debut as assistant director of the film Kanjirapally Kariyachan and Adivaram. His next project was malayalam film actor through a villain's role in Youth Festival (2004) directed by Jose Thomas. It was followed by supporting roles in Malayalam movies including Thaskaraveeran (2005), Rahasya Police(2009), Keralotsavam (2009), The Thriller (2010), The City of God (2011) and Paisa Paisa (2013) etc. after Kishore debuted as a Malayalam Television actor though Asianet serial Manthrakodi directed by A.M.Nazeer telecasted during October 2005 – 2006. The portrayal of the character Aravind C Menon in that serial made Kishore very popular among Malayali audiences. It was followed by Kairali TV serial Kanalpoovu (February 2007 -July 2007) directed by Melilaa Rajasekhar . He later acted in Amrithatv serial The Officer (2008 )directed by G.S.Vijayan  and Mazhavil Manorama serial Kathayile Rajakumari (2011) written and directed by K.K.Rajeev Now he is playing the role of Dr Balachandran in Asianet Serial Karutha Muthu (2014) by Praveen Kadakkavur.

Personal life 
He was married to South Indian actress Charmila from 1996 to 1999, when he was working as an AD on one of her Malayalam films. He had an extra-marital affair while living in Sharjah which led to divorce from Charmila

Awards and nominations

Acting credits

Television

Filmography

As host 

TV shows

Award nights

References

External links
 

Living people
Year of birth missing (living people)